Nea Roda is a village  southeast of Thessaloniki, on the narrowest point of the Athos peninsula in the municipality of Stagira-Akanthos, Chalkidiki, Greece.

Ancient history
In 480 BC, Xerxes, King of Persia, opened a canal for his fleet to pass through. He did this in order to avoid rounding the edge of Athos peninsula, where Mardonius saw his fleet being destroyed ten years earlier due to extreme weather conditions. This is the place where the first attempt of the Persians to conquer the Greek cities-states had failed. The canal needed several years to be built and hundreds of residents of the area (mainly Acanthians, since Acanthus, modern Ierissos, is situated only 5 km away, but also residents of Sani and Ouranoupolis) were used by Xerxes as slaves for the completion of the canal. It is commonly regarded as the site of the world's first offshore wind farm.

Modern origins
The village today is populated by the descendants of immigrants from Roda (now Narlı), and people from various other villages who were forced to leave during the population exchange between Greece and Turkey.

It is considered, by many, to be the largest settlement of refugees coming to North Halkidiki after the Greek Genocide.

Etymology and Roda of Asia Minor
Nea Roda is named after the original village (now in the Turkish provenience of Narlı) called Roda. Rodi (Ρόδι) meaning pomegranate, is the root of the word Roda which means "many pomegranates"; and "Nea" (Νέα) meaning new is the meaning of the first word. This due to an abundance pomegranate trees in the original village. This can be seen even today in the new village, where many people still have pomegranate trees in their backyard.

It is a coastal village in the southwestern beach of the Cyzicus Peninsula, 12 km northwest of Artaki and 28 km west of Michaniona. The Greek name of the settlement was Roda (registered in the book of the metropolis) and the Turkish (presented in official ottoman documents) was Rutya. In early 20th century, the village had almost 200 houses, 150 of which were christian and 50 of which were muslim. The village’s ottomans knew the Greek language but on the contrary, the only ones knowing the Turkish language were those occupied in shipping. Millennia of Greek habitation and history was erased in a few short years in order to rid the region of the indigenous Orthodox Christian peoples of Turkey.

Today
Today, Nea Roda is a modern village with 1,164 residents (2011 census), making it the second biggest town of the municipal unit of Stagira-Akanthos after Ierissos. Fishing, tourism and agriculture are the people’s main occupations.

Gallery

References

External links

Nea Roda
Official website of Municipality of Stagíra-Ákanthos 
360° virtual tour and information about Nea Roda, from 360sites.gr

Populated places in Chalkidiki